Fox Sports is a Mexican pay television network operated by Grupo Multimedia Lauman. The network focuses on sports-related programming including live and pre-recorded event broadcasts, sports talk shows and original programming, available throughout Mexico. The network was previously based in Los Angeles with production studios in Argentina and Mexico. The network continues to use the Fox Sports name under a license agreement with Fox Corporation.

History

The network was launched in 1996 as Prime Deportiva, under the ownership of Liberty Media. Prior to its launch, on October 31, 1995, News Corporation acquired a 50% ownership interest in Liberty's Prime Network group and its international networks (including sister channels Premier Sports and Prime Sports Asia) as part of an expansion of its Fox Sports properties in the Americas. In 1996, the channel was rebranded as Fox Sports Américas, later shortened to Fox Sports in 1999. In 2002, Hicks, Muse, Tate and Furst, a Dallas private equity firm, Liberty Media Corp and News Corp created a holding company (Fox Pan American Sports) to jointly operate FOX Sports Latin America. News Corp owned approximately 38% interest. Liberty later exited leaving HMTF and News Corp as co-owners of the cable network. News Corp purchased the ownership rights from HMTF of FOX Sports en Español and rebranded as FOX Deportes in 2010. News Corp purchased the remaining ownership rights for the holding company from HMTF and fully owned the FOX Sports Latin America cable network in 2011.

In 2009, a second feed called Fox Sports+ (FOX Sports Plus) was launched, to allow simultaneous broadcasting of football. In 2010, FOX Sports signed a deal with UFC to be the first cable network to show it in Latin America. FOX Sports also opened a studio in 2010 in Mexico City where it broadcasts original programming and licensed programming. In 2012, the channel was renamed to Fox Sports 2, whereas Speed Channel was rebranded to Fox Sports 3.

On February 21, 2019, Bloomberg reported that Disney had divest the Fox Sports television network from the 21st Century Fox purchase in order to get an approval from the governments of Mexico and Brazil. The division was among the last major hurdles for the Disney-Fox deal.

On May 22, 2021, Disney announced it would sell Fox Sports Mexico to Grupo Multimedia Lauman with the deal being expected to close in 2021, pending regulatory approval. On June 9, 2021, the transaction was approved by the Mexican Federal Telecommunications Institute.

Feeds

Localised channels 
 Fox Sports Premium — Additional pay-TV channel that was launched in April 2022 to air the Mexican football matches from free-to-air airing on State television, such as the Liga MX (National First Division).

Programming
Fox Sports Mexico broadcasts sports-related programming 24 hours a day in Spanish. The network carries a wide variety of sports events, including soccer (UEFA Europa League, Liga MX etc.), NFL, MLB, UFC, Formula 1 racing and WWE programming. Fox Sports also airs talk shows (NET: Nunca es tarde) as well as other programming including exercise programs.

Sports programming

Football
 UEFA Europa League
 UEFA Europa Conference League
 CONCACAF Champions League
 Liga MX (Only for C.F. Monterrey, León and Pachuca home matches)

Motorsport
 Formula One
 FIA Formula 2 Championship
 FIA Formula 3 Championship
 Porsche Supercup
 FIA World Endurance Championship
 European Le Mans Series
 Rally America
 Extreme E
 NASCAR Cup Series 
 NASCAR Xfinity Series
 NASCAR Gander RV & Outdoors Truck Series

Other sports
 Major League Baseball
 Liga Mexicana de Béisbol
 National Football League
 Ultimate Fighting Championship (PPV main cards on Fox Sports Premium)
 WWE (Raw, SmackDown, Main Event, NXT and Vintage)

Other programming
Alongside its live sports broadcasts, Fox Sports also airs a variety of sports highlight, talk, and documentary styled shows. These include:

Personalities 

  Álex Aguinaga
  Alberto Lati
  Alberto "Beto" Rojas
  Alejandro "Alex" Blanco
  Alejandro Correa
  André Marín
  Antonio Valls
  Brenda Alvarado
  Carlos Cabrera
  Carlos Moreno
  Carlos Rodrigo Hernández
  Carlos Rosado
  Carlos Sequeyro
  Carlos Velasco
  David Espinosa
  Diego Venegas
  Eduardo Sainz
  Eduardo de la Torre
   Ernesto del Valle
  Enrique Gómez
  Emilio León
  Fabián Estay
  Fernando Bastién
  Fernando Cevallos
  Fernando Schwartz
  Fernando Von Rossum de la Vega
  Gabriel Medina Espinosa
  Gerardo Higareda
  Guillermo Salas
  Gustavo Mendoza
  Iris Cisneros
  Jerry Soto
  Jimena Sánchez
  Jonathan Magaña
  José Pablo Coello
  Juan Carlos Casco
  Lorena Troncoso
  Luis Díaz Chapulín
  Luis Hipólito
  Luis Manuel Chacho López
  Luis Ramírez
  Luis Rodríguez
  Luis Mario Sauret
  Marcelo Rodríguez
   María del Valle
  Marlon Gerson
  Mónica Arredondo
  Natalia León
  Oscar Guzmán
  Paulina Chavira
  Rafael Márquez Lugo
  Raúl Orvañanos
  Ricardo García Ochoa
  Ricardo Pato Galindo
  Rubén Rodríguez
  Salim Chartouni
  Santiago Fourcade
  Santiago Puente
  Sergio Treviño
   Tony Rivera
  Ulises Herbert

See also
 Fox Sports International
 Fox Sports (Argentina)
 Fox Sports (Brazil)
 Fox Sports (Latin America)
 GOL TV
 ESPN Latin America
 TyC Sports
 DirecTV Sports
 Claro Sports

References

External links
 

Latin American cable television networks
Television networks in Mexico
Mexico
Television channels and stations established in 1996
Spanish-language television stations
Companies based in Mexico City
Prime Sports